Hugh de Monyton was the Archdeacon of Barnstaple during 1352.

References

Archdeacons of Barnstaple